A refuge area is a countermeasure against pesticide resistance in agriculture. In this technique two adjacent pieces of land are demarcated, and one is applied with a pesticide and one is not - the refuge. Given that resistance develops concurrent with application, a more complex way of dealing with the problem is needed than simply using or not using a particular pesticide. A refuge encourages the overall population to maintain a lower prevalence of resistance by segmenting them into two populations: The population receiving the pesticide and the pesticide-free population. Over time the population that suffers pesticide application will evolve resistance - and more widespread resistance. Meanwhile, the other will continue to be pesticide-naive. However the trick here is that a larger proportion of the main population will die off - allowing the pesticide-naive genetics to more successfully reproduce within the overall area, and thus to dominate the overall population.

Refugia are commonly used today especially to maintain effectiveness in Bt-modified transgenic crops.

References

Environmental effects of pesticides
Pesticides
Crop protection
Insect ecology
Population ecology
Agricultural pests
Ecological genetics
Biological evolution